The Men's 10,000 metres event featured at the 2001 World Championships in Edmonton, Alberta, Canada. There were a total number of 36 participating athletes, with the final being held on 8 August 2001.

Medalists

Records

Final

See also
 2000 Men's Olympic 10.000 metres

References
 Results

Events at the 2001 World Championships in Athletics
10,000 metres at the World Athletics Championships